Matthew R. Schaefer (born February 11, 1976) is an American attorney and politician serving as a member of the Texas House of Representatives for the 6th district. A Republican, Schaefer is assigned to the Defense & Veterans' Affairs and Urban Affairs committees.

He ran without Democratic opposition in his successful bid for a fourth legislative term in the general election held on November 6, 2018. Schaefer defeated Neal Katz, an independent, 37,056 (75.6 percent) to 11,929 (24.4 percent).

Early life and education 

Schaefer attended Cisco College in Cisco, Texas, where he played football. Then he attended Texas Tech University in Lubbock, where he obtained a bachelor's degree in finance and a Juris Doctor from Texas Tech University School of Law.

Career 

In 1999, he worked in a district office of U.S. Senator Phil Gramm. Upon Gramm's retirement, Schaefer joined the United States Navy Reserve and attended law school at Texas Tech University. Schaefer subsequently served as counsel to the chairman of the Sunset Advisory Commission, state representative Carl Isett, on bills regarding insurance and transportation.

Schafer was first elected to the Texas House of Representatives in November 2012. In the 2012 primary election, he had successfully challenged incumbent representative Leo Berman. Schaeffer unseated Berman in the Republican primary election held on May 29, 2012. He received 11,138 votes, or 57.7 percent, to Berman's 8,172 votes (42.3 percent). Schaefer won renomination for a second term in the March 2014 Republican primary, He defeated Tyler businessman Skip M. Ogle, 9,888, or 61.1%, to 6,304, or 38.3%.

Schaefer supports a ban on Democrats being given committee chairmanships as long as the Republicans hold the majority of seats in the Texas House.

Political positions

Gun control
In 2019, following two mass shootings in Texas, Schaefer tweeted his vehement opposition to increasing restrictions such as universal background checks, bans on assault weapons and high-capacity magazine purchases, and mandatory gun buybacks. Instead, he advocates for prayer and discipline in the home, as well as the right to carry for law-abiding single mothers.

Personal life 
Schaefer attends Green Acres Baptist Church, at which he met his wife in 2001.

References

External links 
 Campaign website
Official Texas House of Representatives website
 Matt Schaefer at the Texas Tribune

1976 births
Living people
Republican Party members of the Texas House of Representatives
People from Tyler, Texas
Baptists from Texas
Texas lawyers
Cisco Wranglers football players
Texas Tech University alumni
Texas Tech University School of Law alumni
United States Navy officers
21st-century American politicians
Military personnel from Texas
American gun rights activists